The Permanent Under-Secretary of State for the Cabinet Office, known informally as the Cabinet Office Permanent Secretary, is the second-most senior civil servant of the Cabinet Office. It was conventionally joined with the positions of Cabinet Secretary and Head of the Home Civil Service. This triple role was disbanded in January 2012 after Gus O'Donnell retired.

Due to the Cabinet Office having expanded and taken on new responsibilities since the 2010 election, including cutting costs and driving efficiency across government, it is led by a dedicated Permanent Secretary.

The current Permanent Secretary of the Cabinet Office is Alex Chisholm.

List of Permanent Secretaries 
Ian Watmore (January – June 2012)
Sir Richard Heaton (August 2012 – August 2015)
Sir John Manzoni (August 2015 – April 2020) - Also Chief Executive of the Civil Service
Alex Chisholm (April 2020 – present) - Also Chief Operating Officer for the Civil Service

See also 
Number 10 Downing Street
Civil Service

References

External links 
Cabinet Office
Civil Service Permanent Secretaries

Politics of the United Kingdom
Cabinet Office (United Kingdom)
Civil Service (United Kingdom)